The 2019 Guzzini Challenger was a professional tennis tournament played on hard courts. It was the seventeenth edition of the tournament which was part of the 2019 ATP Challenger Tour. It took place in Recanati, Italy between 1 and 7 July 2019.

Singles main-draw entrants

Seeds

 1 Rankings are as of 24 June 2019.

Other entrants
The following players received wildcards into the singles main draw:
  Matthias Bachinger
  Enrico Dalla Valle
  Giovanni Fonio
  Emiliano Maggioli
  Lorenzo Musetti

The following player received entry into the singles main draw as an alternate:
  Marco Bortolotti

The following players received entry into the singles main draw using their ITF World Tennis Ranking:
  Raúl Brancaccio
  Aslan Karatsev
  Yannick Mertens
  Arthur Rinderknech
  Evgenii Tiurnev

The following players received entry from the qualifying draw:
  Nikola Ćaćić
  Samuele Ramazzotti

Champions

Singles

  Egor Gerasimov def.  Roberto Marcora 6–2, 7–5.

Doubles

  Gonçalo Oliveira /  Ramkumar Ramanathan def.  Andrea Vavassori /  David Vega Hernández 6–2, 6–4.

References

External links
Official Website

2019 ATP Challenger Tour
2019
2019 in Italian tennis
July 2019 sports events in Italy